SnowRunner is a 2020 off-road simulation video game developed by Saber Interactive and published by Focus Home Interactive. Following on from Spintires and the sequel MudRunner, the game was announced as MudRunner 2 in August 2018. Focus Home and Saber Interactive decided to re-reveal the title a year later as Snowrunner. The game was released for Microsoft Windows, PlayStation 4, and Xbox One on April 28, 2020, which was followed by a port for Nintendo Switch on May 18, 2021. It was released for PlayStation 5 and Xbox Series X/S on May 31, 2022. Snowrunner has the player control off-road vehicles as they traverse locations to complete objectives. The game features over 60 different vehicles and more than 15 sandbox locations.

Gameplay

SnowRunner is an off-roading open world simulation video game where the player's job is to deliver cargo to different locations while driving over rough terrain. The game has a damage system in which there is both damage on the physical model and also damage shown through a user interface (UI). Each of the game regions is set after a disaster has taken place, whether natural like a flood or manmade, such as a pipeline breaking. Every location is a rural region in either North America or Russia. As the player progresses by doing certain missions, they earn money which can then be spent on either upgrades for their current vehicles or better vehicles altogether. Both of these usually make it easier for the player to traverse the game's difficult terrain. Along the way the player encounters optional timed missions in which the rewards for completion get better the faster the player completes them. Each region has its own story associated with it, usually involving the player fixing the damage caused by the disaster that occurred in the region. The game also features a mix of aesthetic and mechanical customizations, ranging from changing the color of the player's vehicle, to changing the type of tires on the vehicle or installing a frame attachment. SnowRunner has a large selection of trucks, such as the Chevrolet Kodiak and the BAZ-6402; trucks found in the North American or Russian regions match the nationality of their location. The Russian trucks usually have names differing from real life, while the North American trucks are officially licensed. Mechanical improvements to trucks usually require the player to reach a certain progress threshold before being able to purchase and install them. The game has downloadable content (DLC) including skin packs, map expansions and additional vehicles.

Development 

SnowRunner is based on the same physics engine developed by Pavel Zagrebelnyy, as MudRunner. However during development of SnowRunner, Zagrebelnyy was mainly involved as a consultant, rather than deciding on the gameplay.

Reception

The game received "generally positive" reviews according to media review aggregator website Metacritic across its three platform releases. Some critics praised the visuals and pacing of the game.
The game sold more than one million copies by July 2020. More than 2 million copies had been sold by May 2021.

References

External links
 Official site

2020 video games
Single-player video games
Cooperative video games
Off-roading
Vehicle simulation games
Windows games
Nintendo Switch games
PlayStation 4 games
Xbox One games
Video games developed in the United States
Open-world video games
Focus Entertainment games
Saber Interactive games
Video games set in Alaska
Video games set in Russia
Video games set in Michigan
Video games set in Canada
Video games set in Wisconsin